Yelesen is a village in the Bingöl District, Bingöl Province, Turkey. The village is populated by Kurds of the Pox tribe and had a population of 493 in 2021.

References 

Villages in Bingöl District
Kurdish settlements in Bingöl Province